This is a list of presidents of The London Group.

References

British art
London Group
London-related lists